John Brooks Wheelwright (sometimes Wheelright) (9 September 1897 – 13 September 1940) was an American poet from a Boston Brahmin background. He belonged to the poetic avant garde of the 1930s and was a Marxist, a founder-member of the Trotskyist Socialist Workers Party in the United States. He was bisexual. He died after being struck by an automobile at the intersection of Beacon St. and Massachusetts Avenue in the early morning hours of September 13, 1940.

Wheelwright was descended from the 17th-century clergyman John Wheelwright on his father's side and the 18th-century Massachusetts governor John Brooks on his mother's side. He studied at Harvard University and at Massachusetts Institute of Technology before practising as an architect in Boston. He was editor of the magazine Poetry for a Dime.

Works
 (ed.) A History of the New England Poetry Club, 1932.
 Rock and Shell: Poems 1923-1933, 1933.
 Mirrors of Venus: A Novel in Sonnets, 1914-1938, 1938.
 Political Self-Portrait, 1940
 Selected Poems, 1941.
 Collected Poems, ed. Alvin H. Rosenfeld, 1972.

References

External links
Biography

1897 births
1940 deaths
20th-century American poets
Bisexual men
American LGBT poets
The Harvard Lampoon alumni
Massachusetts Institute of Technology alumni
20th-century American architects
20th-century American LGBT people
American bisexual writers